Amar Dedić (born 18 August 2002) is a Bosnian professional footballer who plays as a right-back for Austrian Bundesliga club Red Bull Salzburg and the Bosnia and Herzegovina national team.

Dedić started his professional career at Red Bull Salzburg, who assigned him to Liefering in 2019 and loaned him to Wolfsberger AC in 2021.

A former youth international for Bosnia and Herzegovina, Dedić made his senior international debut in 2022.

Club career

Red Bull Salzburg
Dedić started playing football at a local club, before joining Sturm Graz' youth setup in 2012. In 2015, he moved to Red Bull Salzburg's youth academy. In August 2019, he signed his first professional contract with the side. He made his professional debut playing for Red Bull Salzburg's feeder team, Liefering, against Amstetten on 26 July at the age of 16. On 19 June 2020, he scored his first professional goal in a triumph over Dornbirn.

In July, Dedić signed a new four-year deal with Red Bull Salzburg. He made his official debut for the side in Austrian Cup game against Bregenz on 9 September.

In June 2021, he was sent on a season-long loan to Wolfsberger AC.

Dedić made his league debut for Red Bull Salzburg on 6 August 2022 against Hartberg. He debuted in UEFA Champions League against Milan on 6 September. On 19 October, he scored his first goal for the team in Austrian Cup match against Admira Wacker.

In January 2023, he extended his contract until June 2027.

International career
Dedić represented Bosnia and Herzegovina at all youth levels. He also served as captain of the under-17 team.

In March 2022, he received his first senior call-up, for friendly games against Georgia and Luxembourg. He debuted against the latter on 29 March.

Career statistics

Club

International

References

External links

2002 births
Living people
People from Zell am See
Austrian people of Bosnia and Herzegovina descent
Citizens of Bosnia and Herzegovina through descent
Bosnia and Herzegovina footballers
Bosnia and Herzegovina youth international footballers
Bosnia and Herzegovina under-21 international footballers
Bosnia and Herzegovina international footballers
Bosnia and Herzegovina expatriate footballers
Association football fullbacks
FC Red Bull Salzburg players
FC Liefering players
Wolfsberger AC players
2. Liga (Austria) players
Austrian Football Bundesliga players
Bosnia and Herzegovina expatriate sportspeople in Austria